Jurka Vićbič (also known as Yurka Vitsbich and Jury Stukalicz, ; 15 June 1905 – 6 January 1975) was a pen name of Sierafim Ščarbakoŭ, a Belarusian writer, publicist and a prominent member of the Belarusian diaspora.

Life in Belarus 
Vićbič was born in Vieliž, Viciebsk Province of the Russian Empire into the family of an Orthodox Priest. He graduated from a teaching college and started writing in the late 1920s.

However, his work L'Shana Haba'ah B'Yerushalayim (lit. "Next year in Jerusalem") was not permitted for publication in Soviet Belarus. Vićbič was accused of “polluting the Belarusian language with archaic words and Belarusian literature with fictional characters hostile to the Soviet reality” and ostracised for his “style which clearly differentiate[d] the writer from the cannons of the contemporary Soviet writing”.

Life in exile 

After World War II, Vićbič lived in Western Europe and then in the US becoming a prominent member of the Belarusian diaspora. He founded a literary society Šypšyna ( (Wild Rose)) and launched a journal with the same name. Later, he was instrumental in the publication of another journal Źviniać zvany Śviatoj Safii ( (The Bells of St Sophia Ringing)).

In 1956 he published a book Nioman flows From Under a Holy Mountain. Further books We will get there! and Anti-Bolshevik Uprisings in Belarus were published posthumously.

Vićbič died on 6 January 1975 and was buried in the South River Belarusian Cemetery in New Jersey, USA.

Notable works 

 The Archbishop and the Serf, 1931 – a historic novel about Jasafat Kuncevyč
 The Death of Irma Lajming, 1932 – a tragic story of a young noble woman
 L'Shana Haba'ah B'Yerushalayim (lit. "Next year in Jerusalem") – a story about a Jewish community in the early 20th century Belarus
 The Formula of Bones’ Resistance, 1937 – another book of prose fiction
 Neman flows From Under a Holy Mountain, 1956 – “a unique explanation of the origin of more than 500 Belarusian geographical names”
 We will get there!, 1975 – a compilation of Vićbič ’s articles
 Anti-Bolshevik Uprisings in Belarus, 1996 – a book about anti-Soviet resistance in Belarus in the 1920s

References 

1905 births
1975 deaths
Belarusian writers
Belarusian emigrants to the United States
American people of Belarusian descent